Lamin Khalifah Fhimah (al-Amīn Khalīfah Faḥīmah; born 4 April 1956) is a former station manager for Libyan Arab Airlines at Luqa Airport, Malta. On 31 January 2001, he was acquitted of 270 counts of murder in the Pan Am Flight 103 bombing trial by a panel of three Scottish judges sitting in a special court at Camp Zeist, Netherlands, in light of evidence that he was in Sweden at the time of the bombing and therefore could not have been a participant. His co-accused, Abdelbaset al-Megrahi, was found guilty by unanimous decision of the court and sentenced to life imprisonment, but later released on compassionate grounds, having always maintained his innocence.

Fhimah was born and lives in Suq el Juma'a, near Tripoli, Libya, with his wife and five children.

Trial

Fhimah was represented by solicitors Eddie McKechnie and Paul Phillips, advocates Richard Keen QC, Jack Davidson QC and Murdo Macleod. Representing Megrahi were his solicitor, Alistair Duff, and advocates William Taylor QC, David Burns QC and John Beckett. Both defendants also had access to Libyan defence lawyer, Mr. Maghour. Court proceedings started on 3 May 2000.

The judges announced their verdict on 31 January 2001. They were unanimous in finding Fhimah not guilty. Fhimah was released from custody and returned to his home at Souk al-Juma in Libya on 1 February 2001.

References

External links
"Case against Fhimah fatally flawed" by Gerard Seenan, The Guardian, 1 February 2001
Original Court Opinion

Pan Am Flight 103
1956 births
Living people
People acquitted of murder
People from Tripoli, Libya
People extradited from Libya
Libyan Airlines
Maltese people of Libyan descent